The Pontiac 2+2 is a full size automobile that was manufactured by Pontiac, built on the B-body chassis. It debuted for the 1964 model year as a trim-only option for the Pontiac Catalina, with special door panels, bucket seats with a center console, and exterior badging. Pontiac marketed the 2+2 as the "big brother" to the popular Pontiac GTO. 

Beginning in 1965 the name Catalina was no longer found on the car, although it was still an option on the Catalina. The 2+2 was equipped with a  V8 engine, dual exhaust, heavy-duty front springs as well as unique exterior body trim. It continued on the same platform, but became a separate Pontiac series for the 1966 model year.  The 2+2 reverted to an option on the Catalina for 1967 and was discontinued in the United States the same year due to poor sales. 

It continued as a series in Canada until 1970. All Canadian-built 2+2's were equipped with a Pontiac body on a Chevrolet chassis, with the full range of Chevrolet engines available from inline 6-cylinder to big-block V8.

The name 2+2 reappeared briefly in 1986 on the Pontiac Grand Prix 2+2 G-body "aerobody" coupe, of which 1,225 were built.

Design 
The designation 2+2 was borrowed from European sports car terminology, for a seating arrangement of two in front plus two in the rear. It was designated officially at Pontiac as a "regular performance" model, a thoroughly confusing designation for a vehicle that was clearly intended to be to the Catalina platform what the GTO was to the A-body Lemans: the standard drivetrain was a 2-barrel carburetor version of Pontiac's  V8 coupled to a floor-mounted 3-speed manual transmission; 3-speed automatic and 4-speed manual were options, as were a 4-barrel and Pontiac's 3x2 Tri-Power configuration. The suspension was stiffened with heavy-duty springs and a sway bar for improved handling. Starting in 1965 the 389 was replaced by a high-compression  V8, with displacement increased to the 428 CID in 1967. 

Although the 2+2 was discontinued by 1968, all options (except the Tri-Power, which Pontiac discontinued after 1966 under a mandate from GM) were still available, and units could be ordered with what amounted to a 2+2 without the badges.

Exterior
The 2+2 was only available as a hardtop coupe or convertible. Distinguishing a 2+2 visually from a Catalina were faux louvers on the fenders or quarter panels. Annual changes meant the look and placement of the louvers were on different locations on the fenders from one year to the next. 1964 was the only year that the 2+2 came without them. Along with the badges that appeared on the fenders, hood, and interior to identify the 2+2, other details that appeared included a metal trim that ran the full length of the car, along the lower body line and skirt on the 1965 and 1966, and at mid-door height on the 1967. Another distinguishing feature was the pin-stripe trim package offered on 1965-67 models.

Interior
The sport interior was equipped with individual bucket seats for all passengers. Automatic transmission cars had a column shift as standard equipment, console and floor shift were optional. Manual transmission cars had a floor shift as standard equipment. The console was an option. The elegant Catalina dashboard was carried over as well and fitted with fully functional gauges. Other optional features included a console-mounted vacuum gauge, to monitor efficient engine use while driving, and a tachometer mounted at the top left corner of the dash fascia and later the hood, as an option in 1967.

Engine 
The Catalina and 2+2 were built on the shorter platform, but came with the same engine options as the larger Pontiac Bonneville model. The smaller  engine was standard in the Catalina, but not available in the 1965-1967 model 2+2s. All Canadian-built 2+2s were equipped with Chevrolet engines. The 1986 GP 2+2's were all equipped with a   GM V8 and automatic transmission.

1964 
Pontiac offered the 2+2 as a $291 ($ in  dollars ) trim option only in 1964 to the base Catalina 2-door hardtop list price of $2,869 ($ in  dollars ). Most of the trim specifics were found in the passenger compartment. Without the 2+2 badges on the outside, it looked like the base Catalina. A 4-speed was available at extra cost, as was an automatic.

1965-67 

Pontiac dropped the "Trophy" name for the 1965 model year, but it was also the year that the model featured a unique  "2+2 V8". Identifying the 2+2 was by the louvers that were incorporated into the bodywork. Standard features included heavy-duty springs and shock absorbers, a 3-speed synchromesh manual transmission (a 4-speed with a Hurst shifter was optional), dual exhausts, and a performance axle ratio of 3.42:1. A new Turbo-Hydramatic automatic transmission replaced the Hydramatic.

Canadian 2+2 
In 1967, GM of Canada debuted the Parisienne 2+2, based on the Parisienne series that replaced the Parisienne Custom Sport from a year earlier. All Pontiacs manufactured and sold in Canada were unique from their US counterparts as GM of Canada fitted re-proportioned US Pontiac bodies to the Chevrolet Impala chassis and drive trains. Canadian purchasers of the 2+2 could order any Chevrolet V8 engine option like the 283 and 327 in³ small-block engines, or the 396 and 427 in³ "Mark IV" big-block. The trim options were slightly different as well, with Chevrolet's 15-inch Rally wheels were used instead of standard 14-inch steel wheels or the optional Pontiac Motor Division's Kelsey-Hayes "8-lug" integral wheel/brake-drum sets. A   straight-six engine was standard in 1967, which meant that the Canadian 2+2 was a Parisienne with louvers, exterior and interior badges, as well as bucket seats and center console (which were options on the Parisienne) as standard equipment.

1967-70

External links 

 www.Pontiac2plus2registry.com - A website dedicated to preserving the history & lore of the Pontiac 2+2

References 

2+2
Cars introduced in 1964
1970s cars
2+2 coupés